Joopaka Subhadra  (also Jupaka and Jūpāka;  born 1962) is a Telugu Dalit activist, poet and writer. She writes poems and short stories that shed light on the lives of Dalits, specifically Dalit women. She is currently working at the Andhra Pradesh Secretariat.

Early life and education
Subhadra was born in Damaranchepalle, Warangal district (present Telangana). She is youngest of 12 siblings, born to Narasimha and Kanaka Veeramma. While studying she lived in a social welfare hostel. Subhadra has been writing poetry since childhood, beginning with subjects like nature, beauty, and friendship.

Subhadra holds Master of Arts and Masters of Philosophy degrees in Telugu Literature. She is an alumnus of Kakatiya University, Telangana. She has also written numerous political essays, book reviews, songs and journalistic pieces. Through her work, she has been instrumental in establishing Mattipoolu (SC, ST, BC and Minority) Women Writers’ Forum. She has also contributed a column to a well-known feminist journal, Bhoomika, and also in journals such as Andhra Jyoti, Ekalavya, Vaartha, and Udyoga Kranti. After starting work at the Andhra Pradesh Secretariat in 1988, she started a Woman's Association for the female employees. In 2015, she was awarded the Amruthala award from the Apuroopa Awards Foundation for her work as a columnist.

Bibliography
Subhadra's work is based on her own life experiences.
Her work includes: 
Rayakka Manyam, A collection of short stories on different aspects of Dalit life.

Shuddi Cheyyali depicting the hard work done by Dalit women

References

Citations

Sources

External links 

 Dalit Women Poet Jupaka Subhadra (2016 video)

Living people
Indian women activists
21st-century Indian women writers
21st-century Indian writers
21st-century Indian poets
Indian women poets
Poets from Telangana
Dalit activists
Dalit women writers
Dalit writers
Women writers from Telangana
Women human rights activists
Year of birth missing (living people)